General elections were held in Trinidad and Tobago on Monday, 10 August 2020, to elect 41 members to the 12th Trinidad and Tobago Republican Parliament. It was the 14th election since gaining independence from the United Kingdom in 1962 and the 22nd national election in Trinidad and Tobago ever. Tracy Davidson-Celestine, political leader of the Tobago Council of the People's National Movement (PNM) became the first woman to lead a Tobagonian political party with representation in the House of Representatives. Additionally, two of the three largest parties elected in 2015, the United National Congress (UNC) and the Congress of the People (COP), were led by women.

President Paula-Mae Weekes, with the advice of Prime Minister Keith Rowley, dissolved Parliament and issued the writs for the election on 3 July 2020.

The first-term incumbent People's National Movement (PNM), led by incumbent Prime Minister Keith Rowley, won 22 seats to form a second five-year term majority government by defeating the opposition United National Congress, led by Opposition Leader Kamla Persad-Bissessar. Her latest in a series of losses at the polls which commenced with the January 2013 Tobago House of Assembly election with the wipeout of her People's Partnership-led administration from the Tobago House of Assembly due to a landslide victory by the Tobago Council of the PNM, losses at the 2013 Trinidadian local elections, St. Joseph and Chaguanas West bye-elections, loss in the 2015 Trinidad and Tobago general election, and subsequent losses in local government bye-elections has placed pressure on her to offer her resignation before the 2020 United National Congress leadership election. The UNC finished with 19 seats.  The results in six constituencies were subject to recounts, causing the final election results to be delayed by a week. This is the first parliamentary election in Trinidad and Tobago where the result was not finalized the day after the election.

Voters elected the 41 members to the House of Representatives by first-past-the-post voting.  Rowley and the new cabinet were sworn in on 19 August 2020.

Electoral system
The 41 members of the House of Representatives are elected by first-past-the-post voting in single-member constituencies. Registered voters must be 18 years and over, must reside in an electoral district/constituency for at least two months prior to the qualifying date, be a citizen of Trinidad and Tobago or a Commonwealth citizen residing legally in Trinidad and Tobago for a period of at least one year.

If one party obtains a majority of seats, then that party is entitled to form the Government, with its leader as Prime Minister. If the election results in no single party having a majority, then there is a hung parliament. In this case, the options for forming the Government are either a minority government or a coalition government.

Parties and candidates
Political parties registered with the Elections and Boundaries Commission (EBC) can contest the general election as a party.

The leader of the party commanding a majority of support in the House of Representatives is the person who is called on by the president to form a government as Prime Minister, while the leader of the largest party or coalition not in government becomes the Leader of the Opposition.

Prior to the election, the People's National Movement, led by Prime Minister Keith Rowley formed a majority government. The largest opposition party was the United National Congress, led by Kamla Persad-Bissessar. The Congress of the People was the sole other party in Parliament, represented by a single MP.

The People's National Movement and the United National Congress have been the two biggest parties, in addition to having supplied every Prime Minister since 1991.

On 14 July 2020, the leader of the Patriotic Front, Mickela Panday, announced that her party will no longer be contesting the 2020 elections due to lack of time to prepare for the August 2020 polls.

The following registered parties are contesting the general election, the People's National Movement is the only party fielding all 41 seats (39 in Trinidad and two in Tobago), 14 parties are contesting seats in Trinidad only and four parties are contesting seats in Tobago only.

Trinidad and Tobago

Trinidad only

Tobago only

Ideology 
Significant differences in the programs of the two major parties UNC and PNM cannot be identified. The UNC is traditionally more of an Indo-Trinidadian party, while Afro-Trinidadians and Tobagonians make up the majority of the PNM's base. In Trinidad, however, racial differences play a subordinate role, the dominant subject areas in the media are the stagnating economy and the high rate of violent crime; here both parties claim that they are better suited to combat them.  In the closing stages of the election campaign, Prime Minister Rowley and citizens accused the UNC of using racist motives in its advertising campaign.

Some parties only represent regional positions. This applies in particular to the parties PDP and OTV, who are running exclusively in Tobago and advocate for regional interests of the island and the MND, which advocates the interests of the Diego Martin region.

The announcement by the opposition UNC that, in the event of an election victory, would build a “dome” over Trinidad to protect against illegal immigrants, made the election campaign relaxed. Before the UNC made it clear that it meant a radar screen, users of social media picked up the topic and indulged in humorous allusions to domes in films and television series.

Process 
The organization of the election was subject to the state Elections and Boundaries Commission (EBC). There were no election observers. Prime Minister Rowley revealed after the election that he had invited observers from CARICOM and the Commonwealth of Nations, but they were unable to pay for the 14-day quarantine required of foreign visitors.

Opinion research in the run-up to the election was carried out by the North American Caribbean Teachers Association (NACTA) and the management consultancy HHB Associates, among others. A NACTA poll shortly after the election date was announced, found that, as in most previous elections, only PNM and UNC would play a role.  An HHB poll published July 25 in the Trinidad and Tobago Guardian found the ruling PNM at 53% and the UNC at 44%. A NACTA poll from July 25, however, saw the UNC one percentage point ahead.  At this point in time, the tendency, known from previous elections, was that Trinidadians with African roots tend to choose the PNM and Trinidadians with Indian roots rather the UNC.

The resignation of former deputy PNM chairwoman Nafeesa Mohammed on July 28, who accused the PNM leadership of arrogance, ignorance and incompetence, caused a media stir.  The Leader of the Opposition, former Prime Minister Kamla Persad-Bissessar, was threatened with death during the election campaign. Minor parties and bodies called on the President to postpone the election in view of the COVID-19 pandemic, which was also rampant in Trinidad, but their requests were denied. A UNC supporter was stabbed on the sidelines of a UNC election campaign on the Saturday before the election.

The polling stations closed at 6:00 p.m. on election Monday.

Marginal seats
The following lists identify and rank seats by the margin by which the party's candidate finished behind the winning candidate in the 2015 election.

For information purposes only, seats that have changed hands through subsequent by elections have been noted. Seats whose members have changed party allegiance are ignored.

  = appears in two lists

Members of Parliament not standing for re-election

Trinidad

Candidates by constituency

Candidate nominations for the election were finalized on Nomination Day (July 17, 2020).  The full candidate list is presented below, along with the incumbent candidates before the election. Non-minister MPs who are not standing for re-election are marked (†)  Government ministers are in bold, and party leaders are in italics.

Trinidad (39 constituencies) & Tobago (2 constituencies)

Campaign slogans

Opinion polls
The North American Caribbean Teachers Association (NACTA) based in New York (led by political analyst Vishnu Bisram), pollster Nigel Henry's Solution by Simulation and pollster Louis Bertrand's H.H.B (H.H.B) & Associates have commissioned opinion polling for the next general election sampling the electorates' opinions.

Graphical summary

Seat projections

Individual polls

Regional/Subnational polls

Tobago East

Tobago West

Moruga/Tableland

St. Joseph

San Fernando West

Tunapuna

Toco/Sangre Grande

Satisfaction

Preferred Prime Minister

Government direction

Voter demographics 

Voter demographic data for 2020 were collected by Solution by Simulation Ltd (SBS) for the Trinidad Express Newspapers completed by 473 likely voters in Trinidad and Tobago by phone and H.H.B. & Associates for the Trinidad and Tobago Guardian completed by 600 registered voters face-to-face suggested the following demographic breakdown:

Results
At 10:30 pm on Election Day, Prime Minister Keith Rowley declared his party the winner of the election with 22 seats.  UNC leader Persad-Bissessar declared wins in 19 seats, taking the Moruga/Tableland seat from the PNM and the St. Augustine seat from the COP. She disagreed with Rowley's victory declaration and objected to the long delays at polling stations.

In total, six seats won by the PNM were disputed: the UNC requested recounts for five constituencies in Trinidad (San Fernando West, St Joseph, Tunapuna, Toco-Sangre Grande and La Horquetta/Talparo), while the Progressive Democratic Patriots (PDP) requested a recount in Tobago East.  The EBC took one week to conduct the recounts, observing only minor changes from the preliminary vote counts: the largest change was an increase of 103 votes for the UNC in San Fernando West.  The counts for the other districts differed by ten votes or fewer.  Rowley and the new PNM cabinet were then sworn in by President Paula-Mae Weekes on the following day, August 19.  The ceremony was held at President's House.

Reactions

Domestic reactions 

 President of Trinidad and Tobago Paula-Mae Weekes in her address "wished the Prime Minister and his Cabinet success in the delivery of their mandate and urged them to get down to the serious business of the good governance of the people of Trinidad and Tobago."
: Chief Secretary of Tobago Ancil Dennis issued "congratulations to Prime Minister Dr. The Honourable Keith Christopher Rowley and his new Cabinet."

Regional reactions 

  
“Prime Minister, your success at the polls is an indication of the confidence that the people of Trinidad and Tobago have in your stewardship and the plans you have outlined for their future,” Ambassador LaRocque said in his congratulatory message to Dr. Rowley.
 / 
CARICOM Chairman and Prime Minister of Saint Vincent and the Grenadines Ralph Gonsalves tweeted: "Congratulations to my brother and friend Dr Keith Rowley and the PNM team on their electoral victory last night. We look forward to growing our already strong relationship with the government and people of TT."
 
 Prime Minister of Saint Lucia Allen Chastanet, in a statement expressed: "Congratulations to Dr. Keith Rowley and the People's National Movement on their new mandate to continue serving Trinidad & Tobago for 5 more years. We wish you, your team and the people of T&T great success throughout this new term and we look forward to working together to build a more united and prosperous region 🇱🇨🇹🇹"
 
 The Ministry of Foreign Affairs (Belize) tweeted: "Congratulations to Hon. @DrKeithRowley on his successful re-election as Prime Minister of the Republic of Trinidad and Tobago @OPM_TT during yesterday's general elections held in challenging circumstances occasioned by the #COVID19 pandemic "
 
 Prime Minister of Antigua and Barbuda Gaston Browne in a letter sent congratulations to Trinidad and Tobago Prime Minister Dr Keith Rowley on his impending re-election, stating "I wish your Government and the people of Trinidad and Tobago every good fortune as you continue to the task of strengthening your great country.”
 
 Prime Minister of Grenada Keith Mitchell congratulated Prime Minister Rowley indicating that "the results show that the people of Trinidad and Tobago are confident in Dr Rowley's leadership abilities, and are looking to you for continued direction to steer the country further along the path of development. With the support of his Cabinet and people, I am confident Dr Rowley will succeed in pushing forward the country's agenda, so that everyone can benefit.'
Leader of the largest opposition party in Grenada Franka Bernardine on behalf of her party National Democratic Congress and the people of Grenada congratulated Prime Minister Rowley on his re-election as Prime Minister of the Republic of Trinidad and Tobago noting 'the use of the virtual platform was new and added a unique dynamic to an already robust and grounded PNM team. The sharp focus and hard work of your campaign team were, no doubt vital to your success.'"

 Prime Minister of Saint Kitts and Nevis Timothy Harris congratulated Prime Minister Rowley on his re-election and the PNM, during a press conference held on Tuesday August 11.

 The opposition People's National Congress led by former President of Guyana David A. Granger congratulated Prime Minister Rowley and the People's National Movement (PNM) on their victory at the General Elections in Trinidad and Tobago on the August 10, 2020.

 Premier of Montserrat Joseph Farrell issued a diplomatic note stating “It is truly my great honour, on behalf of the Government and people of Montserrat, to extend best wishes to you and the People's National Movement (PNM) in the fulfillment of this high office for which you were successfully returned for another term.”

International reactions 

 
 Secretary General of the Organization of American States Luis Almagro tweeted from his official Twitter account: "Our congratulations to Prime Minister @DrKeithRowley. Count on our will to work together to strengthen the pillars of the @OAS_official beginning with development."
 Organisation of African, Caribbean and Pacific States
 Secretary-General Georges Rebelo Chikoti congratulated the Prime Minister Keith Rowley, on his party's victory at the polls and on his re-election for a second term as Prime Minister of Trinidad and Tobago.paying special congratulations to the candidates and that the people of the twin island nation, "through this election, have once again demonstrated their commitment to democracy, peace and stability."

 The Ministry of Communication and Information and Minister of Foreign Affairs Jorge Arreaza tweeted a statement from President of Venezuela Nicolás Maduro using their official accounts where he extended "congratulations to the people of the Republic of Trinidad and Tobago, for the successful holding of the general elections held on Monday, August 10, 2020, in which Prime Minister Keith Rowley was re-elected." President Maduro subsequently phoned Prime Minister Keith Rowley to congratulate him, exchanging experiences in the fight against the COVID-19 pandemic in addition to impressions of the bilateral agenda."
 
 President of Nicaragua Daniel Ortega and Vice President of Nicaragua Rosario Murillo sent a message to Prime Minister Keith Rowley on his victory in the elections writing "with Fraternal Solidarity we celebrate your Triumph yesterday, Monday, August 10, which accredits and confirms You and your Party, the People's National Movement (PNM), for a New Mandate to lead and accompany your People, in these complex Times, with Stability, Work, Health and Peace."

 The Canadian High Commission in Trinidad and Tobago using their official Twitter account expressed: "Congratulations to Prime Minister Dr. Keith Rowley on his re-election as Prime Minister of the Republic of Trinidad and Tobago. Canada looks forward to advancing our longstanding friendship and continuing to collaborate in areas important to both Canada and #TrinidadAndTobago."

 Western Hemisphere Affairs Assistant Secretary Michael Kozak using his official Twitter account expressed: "Today the people of Trinidad and Tobago swear in a prime minister, elected in a transparent process that accurately reflects their will. The United States congratulates @DrKeithRowley on his election victory, & wishes the people of Trinidad and Tobago continuing prosperity."
United States Chamber of Commerce
 
 Parliamentary Under Secretary of State (Minister for the Overseas Territories and Sustainable Development) Liz Sugg, Baroness Sugg tweeted from her official account "My congratulations to @DrKeithRowley on your re-election, and on today's swearing-in to office. I look forward to our continued partnership as the UK and Trinidad & Tobago work together to fight #Covid19, deepen our security cooperation & combat the threat of climate change 🇬🇧🇹🇹"
British High Commissioner Tim Stew using his official Twitter account expressed: "Congratulations @DrKeithRowley on your re-election success!  T&T 🇹🇹 & the UK 🇬🇧 enjoy a strong partnership. I look forward to that partnership depending & prospering in the years ahead."
Councilor and subsequently Mayor of the London Borough of Haringey, a twin town of Arima, Adam Jogee using his official Twitter account expressed his congratulations noting that the re-election was a " solid win for our sister party after a spirited campaign!"

 The Embassy of Mexico in Trinidad and Tobago using its official Twitter account sent congratulations to the new government of Trinidad and Tobago.

 Premier of the People's Republic of China Li Keqiang sent a congratulatory message to Prime Minister Keith Rowley noting the 46 friendly years of diplomatic relations between China and Trinidad and Tobago and that the two countries opened a new page in the history of bilateral friendship by supporting each other in the fight against the COVID-19 epidemic.

 Japan Ambassador to Trinidad and Tobago Tatsuo Hirayama phoned Prime Minister Rowley congratulating him on his re-election as the Prime Minister, and also exchanging views on the bilateral relations between Japan and Trinidad and Tobago.

Footnotes

References

External links
2020 General Elections CNC3
2020 General Eleection Trinidad Guardian
Trinidad and Tobago 2020 Election Centre Live Results Trinidad Express

Trinidad
General election
August 2020 events in North America
Elections in Trinidad and Tobago